Rafael Santa Cruz (29 September 1960 – 4 August 2014) was a renowned Afro-Peruvian musician and author of the book El Cajón Afroperuano on the cajón, a Peruvian instrument created from wooden boxes by slaves when their owners tried to ban the drum culture, fearing the drums would help form slave uprisings.

References

External links
 History of the Cajon

See also
Cajón

1960 births
2014 deaths
Peruvian musicians